Vantačići is a village in Croatia on the island of Krk and in the municipality of Malinska-Dubašnica, in Primorje-Gorski Kotar County. In the 2011 census, the village had 214 inhabitants.

References

Populated places in Primorje-Gorski Kotar County